India–Zambia relations are bilateral diplomatic relations between India and Zambia. India maintains a High Commission of India in Lusaka that is concurrently accredited to Malawi while Zambia has a High Commission in New Delhi.

History 
India and Zambia have cordial relations. The Indian freedom struggle inspired Kenneth Kaunda and Zambia's independence movement. India has supported Zambia's economic and technological development while it has supported India on international fora on the issue of Jammu and Kashmir, terrorism and India's nuclear tests in 1998. Zambia has also extended support to India's claim for permanent membership of an expanded UN Security Council.
Presidents Kaunda, Frederick Chiluba and Levy Mwanawasa have paid state visits to India while Presidents V V Giri, Neelam Sanjiva Reddy and R Venkataraman and Prime Ministers Indira Gandhi and Rajiv Gandhi have led Indian state visits to Zambia.

Economic ties

Trade 
Trade between India and Zambia amounted to $200 million in 2010. Indian exports to Zambia include pharmaceuticals, transport equipment, plastics and chemicals while semi-precious stones, non-ferrous metals, ores (copper and cobalt), semi-precious stones and raw cotton constitute Indian imports from Zambia. India and Zambia aim to increase this trade to $1 billion and Zambia has been seeking investments from India in its core economic sectors.

Investments 
Since 2007, foreign direct investments from India into the Zambian economy has amounted to $3 billion. This includes a $2.6 billion investment by Vedanta Resources in Konkola Copper Mines, the establishment of a $300 million manganese processing plant by Taurian Manganese and Bharti Airtel's establishment of Airtel Zambia after its acquisition of Zain Telecom's African businesses.

Economic cooperation 
India has for long extended government credit to Zambia to facilitate its development and trade between the countries. Support has included soft loans from India's Exim Bank and the donation of transport equipment, agricultural equipment and emergency medical supplies to Zambia. During Vice President Hamid Ansari's visit to Zambia in 2010, India extended lines of credit worth $125 million to Zambia to enable it to expand its power generation capacity and to establish the joint venture, 120 MW, Itezhi Tezhi hydropower project. Zambia is also part of the Duty Free, Quota Free (DFQF) regime for its exports to India as a Least Developed Country and part of the Government of India's lines of credit programme.

Technical cooperation 
India extends technical cooperation to Zambia for training its defence and civilian personnel through the Indian Technical and Economic Cooperation Programme. Indian armed forces personnel have also been deputed to Zambia to help train the Zambian armed forces. Several Zambian defence chiefs have been trained in India and since 1994 a Military Advisory Team of four Indian Army officers have been posted to the Defence Services Command and Staff College in Zambia.

See also 
 Indians in Zambia
 Hinduism in Zambia

References 

 
Zambia
Zambia
Bilateral relations of Zambia
Zambia
India